The Glassic SQ2000 (also written as SQ 2000 and SQ-2000) is an American homebuilt aircraft, designed and produced by Glassic Composites LLC of Sale Creek, Tennessee. When it was available the aircraft was supplied as a kit for amateur construction.

Design and development
The SQ2000 features a cantilever mid-wing with tip rudders and a canard, a four-seat enclosed cabin accessed via doors, fixed or optionally retractable tricycle landing gear and a single engine in pusher configuration.

The aircraft is made from composites.

Like many canard designs, the SQ2000 has lengthy runway requirements.

Operational history
By 1998 the company reported that two kits had been sold and that one aircraft had been completed and was flying.

In December 2013 five examples were registered in the United States with the Federal Aviation Administration, although a total of eight had been registered at one time.

Variants
SQ2000 XP
Retractable gear model. The manufacturer estimated the construction time from the supplied kit as 700 hours.
SQ2000 ES
Fixed gear model, with oleo strut-mounted gear. The manufacturer estimated the construction time from the supplied kit as 750 hours.

Specifications (SQ2000 XP)

References

External links
Photo of a Glassic SQ2000 XP

SQ2000
1990s United States sport aircraft
1990s United States civil utility aircraft
Single-engined pusher aircraft
Mid-wing aircraft
Homebuilt aircraft
Canard aircraft